

Brigadier Charles George Vivian Tryon, 2nd Baron Tryon,  (24 May 1906 – 9 November 1976) was a British peer, British Army officer, and a member of the Royal Household.

Early life and military career
Elder son of George, 1st Baron Tryon, on 3 August 1939, he married Etheldreda Josephine Burrell (1909–2002), known as Dreda; she was a daughter of Sir Merrik Burrell, Bt, CBE (1877–1957).

Tryon graduated from the Royal Military College, Sandhurst and was commissioned as a second lieutenant in the Grenadier Guards in 1926.

Tryon succeeded to his father's title in 1940. The family seat was the Manor House at Great Durnford, Wiltshire; Dreda ran a boarding preparatory school there from 1942 until 1992.

Promoted to major in 1943, by the end of the Second World War he was a war substantive lieutenant colonel, with permanent promotion in 1948. He retired in 1949 and was granted the honorary rank of brigadier.

Career in the Royal Household
Lord Tryon began his career in the Royal Household as the Assistant Keeper of the Privy Purse to King George VI in 1949. Still the Assistant Keeper of the Privy Purse upon the ascension of Queen Elizabeth II, Lord Tryon was appointed Keeper of the Privy Purse and Treasurer to the Queen on 16 October 1952. Lord Tryon served as Keeper of the Privy Purse and Treasurer to the Queen until 1 November 1971, being appointed a Permanent Lord-in-Waiting upon his retirement.
In 1968, as the Queen’s chief financial manager, he sought to secure an exemption from proposed amendments to the Race Relations Act. He stated that it was policy to  allow people of colour only to work as domestic servants at the Palace.

Later life and death
In 1972, Lord Tryon was appointed a deputy lieutenant in the County of Wilts. Lord Tryon died in 1976, aged 70, and was succeeded by his only son, Anthony Tryon.

Honours
During his military career Lord Tryon was Mentioned in dispatches, later being awarded the Distinguished Service Order. Lord Tryon was appointed a Knight Commander of the Royal Victorian Order in 1953, and promoted to Knight Grand Cross in 1968. Appointed a Knight Commander in the Civil Division of the Order of the Bath in 1962, he was also an Officer of the Order of St John. He received the Queen Elizabeth II Version of the Royal Household Long and Faithful Service Medal in 1969 for 20 years service to the British Royal Family.

Arms

References

1906 births
1976 deaths
Grenadier Guards officers
British Army personnel of World War II
Barons in the Peerage of the United Kingdom
Graduates of the Royal Military College, Sandhurst
Officers of the Order of St John
Knights Grand Cross of the Royal Victorian Order
Knights Commander of the Order of the Bath
Members of the Privy Council of the United Kingdom
Companions of the Distinguished Service Order
Grand Crosses with Star and Sash of the Order of Merit of the Federal Republic of Germany
Permanent Lords-in-Waiting
British Army brigadiers
Members of the British Royal Household
Charles